is a 2012 Japanese mystery drama film directed by Kei Horie. The film is based on a play.

Cast
 Azusa Okamoto as Yasuko Hata
 Narushi Ikeda as Detective Yamanaka
 Masato Wada as Satoshi Yuminaga
 Kenichi Takito as Junpei Tendo
 Manpei Takagi as Kazuki Komagata
 Miwako Wagatsuma as Akira Yokoyama
 Tadashi Sakata as Sokyu Akagi
 Takashi Nishina as Daikichi Kobayashi	
 Hajime Yamazaki as  Keisuke Ijima

References

External links

Japanese films based on plays
2010s Japanese films
2010s mystery drama films
Japanese mystery drama films
2012 drama films
2012 films

ja:センチメンタルヤスコ#映画